Charles Pope (1748–1803) was a Continental Army officer during the American Revolutionary War.

He was named a captain in the Delaware Regiment in 1776, and was promoted to Lieutenant Colonel in 1777. He resigned from the service in 1779.

Early life 

Not much is known of Charles' early life. He was born in 1748 at Smyrna, Delaware, and his father was most likely named Thomas. He was a merchant.

Military career  

When the American Revolutionary War broke out in 1775, Pope gathered a local militia in his home town in order to fight the British. In 1776, he was commissioned Captain by the Continental Congress, and later lieutenant-colonel in the Delaware Regiment.

Later life and death 

After the American Revolutionary War, Pope returned to Duck Creek Crossroads. When he moved to Georgia in the closing years of the eighteenth century, he sold a plantation of 270 acres with a house and new barn, a farm of 150 acres, a complex of wharves and grain storage buildings on the Duck Creek, a lot in the town of Duck Creek Crossroads on which stood a tavern and a tanyard, his original brick store in the center of town, and his town home consisting of two-storey brick house, nursery, kitchen, stable, carriage house, smoke house, and granary.

Charles Pope was married twice. His first wife, Jane Stokesly, bore him five children, all sons. She died in 1793. Pope's second wife was Sarah Simpson, whom he married in 1799; there were no children. Pope died in Georgia on February 16, 1803, and was buried there on his farm in Columbia County.

References

1748 births
1803 deaths
Continental Army officers from Delaware